The 37th Vehbi Emre & Hamit Kaplan Tournament 2019, was a wrestling event held in Istanbul, Turkey between 1 and 3 February 2019.

This international tournament includes competition men's Greco-Roman wrestling. This ranking tournament was held in honor of the Olympic Champion, Hamit Kaplan and Turkish Wrestler and manager Vehbi Emre.

Medal overview

Medal table

Greco-Roman

Participating nations
146 competitors from 11 nations participated.

 (11)
 (12)
 (6)
 (1)
 (15)
 (1)
 (10)
 (7)
 (1)
 (1)
 (81)

References 

Vehbi Emre and Hamit Kaplan
2019 in sport wrestling
February 2019 sports events in Turkey
Sports competitions in Istanbul
International wrestling competitions hosted by Turkey
Vehbi Emre & Hamit Kaplan Tournament